Aveling-Barford was a large engineering company making road rollers, motorgraders, front loaders, site dumpers, dump trucks and articulated dump trucks in Grantham, England. In its time, it was an internationally known company.

History

Ruston and Hornsby

Aveling-Barford underwent a dramatic revival. First established in 1850 its owners incorporated a limited liability company on 16 July 1895 to hold the business with the name Aveling & Porter. Though Aveling & Porter's operations remained independent in 1919 its shares were sold to a new holding company, Agricultural & General Engineers (AGE). The holding company was unsuccessful and collapsed in 1932. Its fourteen subsidiaries – which in the mid-1920s had 10,000 employees – were sold by AGE's liquidator and most of them regained their independence.

Two subsidiaries, Aveling & Porter and Barford & Perkins, kept on operating profitably throughout the collapse of their parent. Edward Barford of Barford & Perkins also chairman of Aveling & Porter enlisted the help of R. A. Lister & Co and its associate Ruston & Hornsby.  Lister and Ruston bought the two companies from the receiver. The products of all four businesses were fitted with diesel engines.

Aveling & Porter immediately took over the activities of Barford & Perkins changing its own name to Aveling-Barford on 13 February 1934. Early in 1934 operations moved from Rochester to a 36-acre site, Invicta Works, on long-term lease (to 2009) from Ruston & Hornsby at Grantham. On the board of directors were Edward James Barford and William Geoffrey Barford (from Barford & Perkins), and John Heinrich Wulff Pawlyn, a director of Ruston & Hornsby based at the Ransomes subsidiary in Ipswich, and George Ruston Sharpley, the managing director of Ruston & Hornsby. For many years all the vehicles were powered by R & H diesel engines. R & H had also previously made road rollers, but concentrated this all at Grantham.

Aveling-Barford was listed on the London Stock Exchange in July 1937.

Public company
In the 1930s it made cooling equipment for dairy farms, and cooking equipment for hotels, hospitals, and canteens. It became a public company on 29 June 1937. At this time it claimed to make 75% of the road rollers in Britain, and world leaders in their field.

Edward Barford (23 April 1898 – 11 July 1979) became the chairman of the company from 1933, remaining until 1968. It began making its first earth moving equipment – the Aveling Dumper.

During the Second World War the company made Bren Gun Carriers, shell fuse caps and the Loyd Carrier.

The company also made calfdozers (small bulldozers). From April 1946 two subsidiary companies were formed – Barford Developments Ltd and Barford (Agricultural) Ltd. On 17 September 1946 a new factory in Newcastle upon Tyne was opened.

British Leyland
In 1967 it became part of British Leyland. British Leyland engines were to be used as part of the deal, but there were reliability problems.
In 1975 Aveling-Barford became Aveling Marshall after BLMC acquired Marshall-Fowler.

The company was bought in December 1983 by American businessman Reid Eschallier (3 December 1934 – 13 July 2007) from Pennsylvania. In 1979, the construction equipment company Acrow had wanted to take over Barfords

Visits
Conservative prime minister Alec Douglas-Home visited Grantham on Friday 29 November 1963, where he stayed overnight in Leadenham, at the home of Lt-Col William Reeve, the chairman of the local Conservative group. The prime minister toured the factory from 1pm, with Edward Barford and went for a day of pheasant shooting at Scopwick, and to Leadenham Hall; he had dinner at 6pm in the George Hotel

Products
Aveling-Barford were best known for their line of three-point roadrollers including the small GA up to the GC, The "Master Pavior" 3-point roller was one of the most famous diesel rollers. However many other types of earthmoving machinery were designed and manufactured by Aveling Barford in England.

A-B were also significant for their all wheel driven and all wheel steering motor graders often using Leyland Trucks running gear as were also producers of ADT models called the RDX Series with 6X6. A line of rigid dumpers was manufactured from 30 tonne RD030 through to the 50 tonne RD050 and eventually a RD55 and RD65 were added.

A new dumptruck the RD44 was unveiled at Bauma to try and rejuvenate the line of dumptrucks but with limited success

During the 1970s to the 1980s A-B were producing their own range of front loaders with 4X4 axles and are fitted with Cummins, Leyland or Ford heavy duty diesel engines. They resembled the popular British made Bray or Ford loader models of the 1980s.

Site dumpers were first mass manufactured by A-B in the 1940s mostly with Fordson Tractor Diesel engines. Today these are still made and sold under the Barford name.

Modern day incarnation
The site was bought by Wordsworth Holdings in 1988, who went into administration in 2010. Barfords is now owned by Invictas Engineering.

Update:  12 October 2015 Invictas Engineering sold the Supply of parts to Shellplant www.shellplant.co.uk

In 2006 Singapore-based ST Kinetics bought the rights to the Aveling Barford RXD series articulated dumptrucks, which are now sold under the TRX Build brand.
 
In August 2007 Moxy Engineering of Norway announced plans to buy the intellectual property rights of the Barford rigid dump truck range.

In 2008 Moxy was purchased by the South Korean Doosan (formerly Daewoo), and renamed to Doosan Moxy As and later Doosan Infracore Norway AS. The project was later cancelled and the prototype of the new range earlier presented at Bauma in 2007 was scrapped.

Barfords' sports field is still in existence, called Arnoldfield, in Gonerby Hill Foot.

In October 2012 Gravity FM, Grantham's community radio station produced a tribute in words and music to Aveling Barford, on sale to raise funds to support the running costs of the station.

Former employees
 David Anderson, chief executive from 2003 to 2005 of Jobcentre Plus, and from 1996 to 2003 of the Yorkshire Building Society (graduate trainee from 1977 to 1980)

See also
 Stothert & Pitt
 Thomas Green & Son, also made road rollers in the 1960s
 Unit Rig haul trucks

References

External links

 Reconditioned trucks
 Steam-powered road rollers
 Graces Guide
 Road Roller Association
 Grantham Townscape

Companies based in Grantham
Defunct truck manufacturers of the United Kingdom
Construction equipment manufacturers of the United Kingdom
Defunct motor vehicle manufacturers of England
Companies formerly listed on the London Stock Exchange
Vehicle manufacturing companies established in 1934
1934 establishments in England
British Leyland
Vehicle manufacturing companies disestablished in 1988
1988 disestablishments in England
British companies disestablished in 1988
British companies established in 1934